The  were a corps of imperial bodyguards and fiscal officials in the Byzantine Empire, attested from the 11th to the 15th centuries.

History and functions
The  appear in the mid-11th century, with the first known , John Iberitzes, attested in 1049. As the princess and historian Anna Komnene writes, they were the courtiers "closest" to the emperor. With the military crisis of the 1070s, they were also formed into a regular palace guard regiment, serving alongside the Varangian Guard in the Komnenian-era army.

The  are attested as late as 1387, and likely continued to exist after. The title is attested as late as 1451, when it was held by the historian George Sphrantzes.

References

Sources

 

Guards units of the Byzantine Empire
Byzantine fiscal offices